Bristol Bay Productions is a film company (the sister company of Walden Media), which produces films based on the books and lives of famous and influential people. It was established in 1995 as Crusader Entertainment, and was renamed as Bristol Bay Productions in 2003.

Filmography

Released films

As Crusader Entertainment
Joshua (2002) (co-production with Epiphany Films LLC and Feelmax)
Children on Their Birthdays (2002) (co-production with Frantic Redhead Productions and Salem Productions)
Swimming Upstream (2003) (co-production with Pacific Film & Television Commission)
Where the Red Fern Grows (2003) (co-production with Elixir Films, Bob Yari Productions, MysticArt Pictures, WTRFG, LLC, Doty-Dayton Production, and Persik Productions)
Danny Deckchair (2003) (co-production with Macquarie Film Corporation, Cobalt Media Group, and City Productions Pty. Ltd.)

As Bristol Bay Productions
 Ray (2004, co-production with Universal Pictures)
 Sahara (2005, co-production with Paramount Pictures)
 The Game of Their Lives (2005, co-production with IFC Films)
 Amazing Grace (2007, co-production with Roadside Attractions)
 The Great Buck Howard (2008, co-production with Magnolia Pictures, Walden Media and Playtone)

Film production companies of the United States
Anschutz Corporation
Entertainment companies based in California
Companies based in Beverly Hills, California
Entertainment companies established in 1995
1995 establishments in California